PL8 or similar may refer to:
 PL/8, a programming language
 PL-8 (missile), a Chinese missile
 Holbeton, Devon, United Kingdom postcode
 Levasseur PL.8, a French aircraft
 PL 8 Ersatz P.II, a German Parseval airship
PL8.email, a web platform that sends email messages to vehicle plates